The steam locomotives of British Railways were used by British Railways over the period 1948–1968. The vast majority of these were inherited from its four constituent companies, the "Big Four".

In addition, BR built 2,537 steam locomotives in the period 1948–1960, 1,538 to pre-nationalisation designs and 999 to its own standard designs. These locomotives had short working lives, some as little as five years, because of the decision to end the use of steam traction by 1968, against a design life of over 30 years and a theoretical final withdrawal date of between 1990 and 2000.

Background
British Railways was created on 1 January 1948 principally by the merger of the "Big Four" grouped railway companies: the Great Western Railway (GWR), the London, Midland and Scottish Railway (LMS), the London and North Eastern Railway (LNER) and the Southern Railway (SR). It inherited a wide legacy of locomotives and rolling stock, much of which needed replacing due to the ravages of World War II.

Locomotives inherited from constituent companies
A wide variety of locomotives was acquired from the four major constituent companies. These had generally standardised their own designs. See:
 Locomotives of the Great Western Railway
specifically List of GWR locomotives as of 31 December 1947
 Locomotives of the Southern Railway
specifically List of Southern Railway locomotives as of 31 December 1947
 Locomotives of the London, Midland and Scottish Railway
specifically List of LMS locomotives as of 31 December 1947
 Locomotives of the London and North Eastern Railway
specifically List of LNER locomotives as of 31 December 1947

In addition, a handful of locomotives were inherited from minor constituents.

The 1948 Locomotive Exchange Trials compared locomotives from each company against each other.

Classification

After initially using letter prefixes (E for ex-LNER, M for ex-LMS, S for ex-SR, and W for ex-GWR locomotives, as used for other inherited rolling stock), a numbering scheme was decided on in March 1948. Generally ex-GWR locomotives retained their numbers (and hence were able to retain their cast brass number plates) and it was decided to add 30000 to the Southern numbers, 40000 to the LMS numbers and 60000 to the LNER numbers. There were some exceptions though.

BR adopted a slightly modified version of the LMS classification system, itself based on the Midland Railway's system. Each locomotive class was given a number 0–9 that signified its power, 0 for the least powerful and 9 for the most, with a suffix of F or P, indicating freight and passenger roles respectively. Freight power ranged from 0–9, passenger from 0–8. Many locomotives were used for both roles, in which case they were given two class numbers, the P-rating first e.g. 3P4F or 6P5F. A slight change from the LMS system saw those where the freight classification (x) equalled the passenger classification (also x) reclassified as xMT, MT standing for mixed-traffic, e.g. for the LMS Black Five locomotives, LMS 5P5F became BR 5MT. Mixed traffic locomotives had power in the range of classes 2–6.

Locomotives acquired from the War Department

In addition to the inherited and new-build locomotives, B.R. also purchased 620 locomotives of three types from the War Department. These had been in use on railways in Great Britain and elsewhere in Europe during the Second World War. For two of these types, BR was adding to two classes it already had. BR had inherited 556 ex-LMS Stanier Class 8F 2-8-0s, and added 39 in 1949 and an additional three in 1957, bringing the class total to 666. Additionally, it had acquired 200 ex-LNER Class O7 2-8-0s of the WD Austerity 2-8-0 type, to which it added another 533 examples. The ex-LNER locomotives were later renumbered from the ex-LNER 6xxxx series into the BR series as 90000-90100, 90422-90520. The third type, of which it had no other examples, were the 25 of the WD Austerity 2-10-0s. Of the eight WD ex-LMS Fowler Class 3F 0-6-0Ts exported to France, the five survivors were repatriated in 1948, and resumed their original numbers in the sequence of LMS Fowler Class 3F locomotives (albeit with the additional 40000 that identified ex-LMS locomotives under BR ownership). The ex-WD Hunslet Austerity 0-6-0STs were ex-LNER Class J94 locomotives and are included in the total of LNER locomotives inherited.

Locomotives built by BR to Big Four designs
Initially, the newly nationalised network continued to be run as four different concerns, and pursued the policy of building of well-established designs. Some of these were already quite old, one class (the J72 tank engines) being a Pre-Grouping design.

GWR designs

Great Western management was opposed to nationalisation and built many pannier tanks, resulting in a surplus of them. 452 locomotives were built to ex-GWR designs, of which 341 were pannier tanks.

SR designs
The SR designs built by BR included 50 Bulleid Pacifics. Many of these were later rebuilt in an un-streamlined form. BR also completed and steamed one of the experimental SR Leader class, but did not take it into stock, and cancelled the remaining orders in various states of completeness.

LMS designs
640 locomotives were built to LMS designs. They were built at various BR works, not just at the ex-LMS works at Crewe, Derby and Horwich. Many of the later BR standard designs were based on the LMS designs.

LNER designs

BR built 396 locomotives to LNER designs. The J72 Class was a North Eastern Railway design, dating from 1898.

BR 'Standard' classes

From 1951, BR started to build steam locomotives to its own standard designs intended to succeed a disparate number of pre-grouping engines. They were largely based on LMS practice but incorporating ideas and modifications from the other constituent companies and America. Their design was overseen by Robert Riddles.

Characteristic features were taper boilers, high running plates, two cylinders and streamlined cabs.

Although more were ordered, 999 BR "Standards" were constructed: the last, 92220 Evening Star, was built in 1960. Most never achieved their potential service life and were withdrawn in working order.

Riddles put his case for continuing to build steam locomotives in his presidential address to the Institution of Locomotive Engineers in November 1950. He compared capital costs to show that steam was cheaper than the alternatives, though he didn't mention productivity differences, except to say fuel costs did not rank very high relative to total costs. For example, a Class 5 cost £16,000, compared to £78,100 for a 1,600 h. p. diesel, £138,700 for a gas turbine, or £37,400 for electric. He calculated the costs per drawbar horse power as £13 6s (steam), £65 (diesel), £69 7s (turbine) and £17 13s (electric). Riddles retired in 1953.

Liveries
Initially, BR decided upon blue for the largest passenger types, with GWR-style Brunswick green for passenger locomotives, and LNWR-style lined black for mixed-traffic locomotives. The blue however was quickly dropped and passenger livery for all locomotive classes reverted to green. Towards the end locomotives tended to be painted in lesser liveries, and often this was covered in a layer of grime.

Two logos (or crests) were used during the period. The first logo (1948–1956) was the "Lion and Wheel" (sometimes nicknamed the  "Cycling Lion"), showing a lion standing over a spoked wheel upon which the words "British Railways" were displayed. The second logo (1956–1965) featured a lion holding a wheel (which gave rise to the nickname "ferret and dartboard"), sitting in a crown, with the words "British" and "Railways" to left and right. (Passenger stock and certain diesel locomotives used a roundel variant, where the words "British Railways" were in a ring surrounding the crest.) From 1965, the BR Corporate Image and "Double Arrow" logo was adopted, but this logo was not applied to steam locomotives (except on the Vale of Rheidol line).

Certain classes of steam locomotives were barred from working south of Crewe with effect from 1st September 1964 due to clearance issues with the new overhead electrification. Those locomotives affected had a broad yellow band painted diagonally across their cabsides to denote this prohibition.

Withdrawal
The 1955 Modernisation Plan called for the phasing out of steam traction. Major withdrawals occurred during 1962–1966, and steam traction ended in August 1968, coinciding with the Beeching Axe.

Some tank engines were sold to London Transport, where steam traction remained in use until 1971. Steam on industrial lines remained until the 1980s.

With regular maintenance, British steam locomotives typically lasted for approximately 30 years of intensive use, before major components would need to be replaced or overhauled. For a steam locomotive built in 1960, the economic lifespan would have led to it being withdrawn in the 1990s.

Vale of Rheidol finale
The locomotives of the Vale of Rheidol Railway, from the 2 ft narrow gauge Vale of Rheidol Railway (VoR) in Mid-Wales, had been inherited with the rest of the GWR stock in 1948. BR however continued to use steam locomotives on the line as a commercial heritage railway. This situation continued until 1989 when the line was privatised, and steam continued. These engines were the only steam locomotives to receive the Rail Blue with double arrow livery.

Preservation 
Withdrawn locomotives were sent for scrap to various locations around the United Kingdom, either to the railway workshops at Brighton in Sussex, Crewe in Cheshire, Darlington in County Durham, Doncaster in South Yorkshire and Swindon in Wiltshire, etc.; or to scrap metal merchants who had been approved to bid on the contracts – these included Woodham Brothers scrapyard in Barry, Vale of Glamorgan, South Wales, which became a centre for the UK railway preservation movement.

Former main line locomotives, along with various smaller industrial shunters, form the backbone of steam motive power for heritage railways. Main line running on charter trains is possible and they run under TOPS code as Class 98.

Preserved Locomotives 
Over 40 BR Standard Locomotives are preserved.
 BR Standard Class 9F/2-10-0 – 9 examples 
 BR Standard Class 8 (Duke) – 1 example
 BR Standard Class 7 (Britannia) – 2 examples
 BR Standard Class 5/5MT – 5 examples
 BR Standard Class 4/4-6-0 – 6 examples
 BR Standard Class 4/2-6-0 – 4 examples
 BR Standard Class 4 Tank – 15 examples
 BR Standard Class 2/2-6-0 – 3 examples (briefly there was a 4th)

In addition to the preserved ex-BR Standard Class locomotives, three new-build projects are currently underway.

On the Bluebell Railway, Barry scrapyard-condition 2MT 2-6-0 No.78059 is being used as the basis for a new built 2MT 2-6-2T, to be numbered 84030. Three other members of this class of locomotive survive in preservation. None of the 78xxx class were ever allocated to, or regularly worked on the Southern Region, so the decision was taken to convert this locomotive to the tank engine (2-6-2T) version, of which none now exist.

The 82045 Steam Locomotive Trust is part way through building a brand new example of the 3MT tank engine, currently under construction at Bridgnorth on the Severn Valley Railway.

The 'Clan' Project is constructing a new-build 6MT 4-6-2, to be numbered No. 72010. Following the naming sequence planned by British Railways before the cancellation of the second batch of Clan class locomotives, the locomotive will be named Hengist. Final assembly of the locomotive is aimed to be completed at the Great Central Railway prior to career on both the mainline and heritage railways.

See also
For a list of Diesel and Electric locomotives of British Railways:
 List of British Rail classes
 Motive power depot
 List of British Railways shed codes

References

Further reading

 Hugh Longworth  British Railway Steam Locomotives 1948–1968, Ian Allan. 

Steam locomotives
Steam locomotives
British Railways